The Pastry War, also known as the First French Intervention in Mexico or the First Franco-Mexican War (1838–1839), began in November 1838 with the naval blockade of some Mexican ports and the capture of the fortress of San Juan de Ulúa in the port of Veracruz by French forces sent by King Louis-Philippe. It ended in March 1839 with a British-brokered peace. The intervention followed many claims by French nationals of losses due to unrest in Mexico. This would be the first of two French invasions of Mexico; a second, larger intervention would take place in the 1860s.

Background 
During the early years of the new Mexican republic there was widespread civil disorder as factions competed for control of the country. The fighting often resulted in the destruction or looting of private property. Average citizens had few options for claiming compensation as they had no representatives to speak on their behalf. Foreigners whose property was damaged or destroyed by rioters or bandits were usually  also unable to obtain compensation from the Mexican government and they began to appeal to their own governments for help and compensation.

Commercial relationships between France and Mexico existed prior to Spain's recognition of Mexico's independence in 1830, and after the establishment of diplomatic relationships France rapidly became Mexico's third largest trade partner. However, France had yet to secure trade agreements similar to those that the United States and United Kingdom (then Mexico's two largest trade partners) had, and as a result of this French goods were subject to higher taxes.

Chronology

In a complaint to King Louis-Philippe, a French pastry chef known only as Monsieur Remontel claimed that in 1832 Mexican officers looted his shop in Tacubaya (then a town on the outskirts of Mexico City). However, Mexican sources claim that the officers, from Santa Anna's government, simply refused to pay for their bills. Remontel demanded 60,000 pesos as reparations for the damage (his shop was valued at less than 1,000 pesos).

In view of Remontel's complaint (which gave its name to the ensuing conflict) and of other complaints from French nationals (among them the looting in 1828 of French shops at the Parian market and the execution in 1837 of a French citizen accused of piracy), in 1838 prime minister Louis-Mathieu Molé demanded from Mexico the payment of 600,000 pesos (3 million Francs) in damages, an enormous sum for the time, when the typical daily wage in Mexico City was about one peso (8 Mexican reals).

When president Anastasio Bustamante made no payment, the King of France ordered a fleet under Rear Admiral Charles Baudin to declare and carry out a blockade of all Mexican ports on the Gulf of Mexico from Yucatán to the Rio Grande, to bombard the Mexican fortress of San Juan de Ulúa, and to seize the city of Veracruz, which was the most important port on the Gulf coast. French forces captured Veracruz by December 1838 and Mexico declared war on France.

With trade cut off, the Mexicans began smuggling imports in Mexico via Corpus Christi (then part of the Republic of Texas). Fearing that France would blockade the Republic's ports as well, a battalion of Texan forces began patrolling Corpus Christi Bay to stop Mexican smugglers. One smuggling party abandoned their cargo of about a hundred barrels of flour on the beach at the mouth of the bay, thus giving Flour Bluff its name. The United States soon sent the schooner Woodbury to help the French in their blockade. 

Meanwhile, acting without explicit government authority, Antonio López de Santa Anna, known for his military leadership, came out of retirement from his hacienda named "Manga de Clavo" near Xalapa and surveyed the defenses of Veracruz. He offered his services to the government, which ordered him to fight the French by any means necessary. He led Mexican forces against the French and fought at the Battle of Veracruz (1838). In a skirmish with the rear guard of the French, Santa Anna was wounded in the leg by French grapeshot. His leg was amputated and buried with full military honors. Exploiting his wounds with eloquent propaganda, Santa Anna catapulted back to power.

Peace restored
The French forces withdrew on 9 March 1839 after a peace treaty was signed. As part of said treaty the Mexican government agreed to pay 600,000 pesos as damages to French citizens while France received promises for future trade commitments in place of war indemnities. However, this amount was never paid and that was later used as one of the justifications for the second French intervention in Mexico of 1861.

Following the Mexican victory in 1867 and the collapse of the Second French Empire in 1870, Mexico and France would not resume diplomatic relationships until 1880 when both countries renounced claims related to the wars.

Notes

External links

Conflicts in 1838
Conflicts in 1839
1838 in Mexico
1838 in France
1839 in France
1839 in Mexico
Independent Mexico
Wars involving Mexico
Wars involving France
Wars involving the United Kingdom
Second French intervention in Mexico
19th century in Mexico
Looting
19th-century military history of France
19th-century military history of the United Kingdom